Laglio is an Italian  of 930 inhabitants in the Province of Como in Lombardy. It is on the western shore of the south-western branch of Lake Como,  from the town of Como.

Geography 

The town itself is made up of several hamlets: Germanello, Ossana, Soldino, Ticée, e Torriggia.

On the slopes of Mount Colmegnone above the hamlet of Torriggia is the famous "Bear Hole" cave (which can be visited upon request at the commune offices) within which were found the bones of Ursus spelaeus. The Bear Hole is made up of various rooms with partly unexplored underground lakes, and is rich in spring water.

Clooney connection 
In 2001, George Clooney purchased a luxurious villa which once was owned by the Heinz family, Villa Oleandra, as a hideaway in which to spend substantial parts of the year. The villa also served as the filming location for some scenes of the movie Ocean’s Twelve. In June 2007, Clooney expressed opposition to a planned council development of the lakefront near his villa, and hosted a meeting of a local protest committee also opposed to the development.

Main sights
Villa Veronesi at Punta di Torriggia
Pyramid of Frank, a 19th century funerary monument
Church of S. Bartolomeo
Cave of "Buco dell'Orso" ("Bear's Hole"), where numerous fossils of Ursus spelaeus were found

Infrastructure and transport

Roads and highways 
Laglio is easily reached from Como on the SS340 Via Regina.  Coming from Milan and Switzerland take the "Lago di Como" (previously "Como Nord") exit off the A9 and from there follow the signs to Menaggio.

Public transport 
Laglio is served by ASF autolinee buses between Como and Argegno.  The bus is numbered the C10/C20 and can be caught at both the bus station (next to Como Lago train station) and the main train station (Como San Giovanni)

Administration 
The mayor of Laglio is Roberto Pozzi, who was elected for his first term on 15 April 2008.

References 

Cities and towns in Lombardy